Mohamed Abbas Darwish (born 28 March 1986 in Dubai) is an Emirati triple jumper.

He won the bronze medal in the triple jump at the 2003 World Youth Championships in Athletics in Sherbrooke, Quebec, Canada. He competed in the triple jump event at the 2012 Summer Olympics, finishing 13th in the qualifier and failing to advance to the finals.

References

External links
 

1986 births
Living people
Emirati triple jumpers
Male triple jumpers
Emirati male athletes
Sportspeople from Dubai
Olympic athletes of the United Arab Emirates
Athletes (track and field) at the 2012 Summer Olympics
Athletes (track and field) at the 2006 Asian Games
Athletes (track and field) at the 2010 Asian Games
Athletes (track and field) at the 2018 Asian Games
Asian Games competitors for the United Arab Emirates